Protein MAK16 homolog is a protein that in humans is encoded by the MAK16 gene.

References

Further reading